"Portrait in Celluloid" was an American television movie broadcast by CBS on November 24, 1955, as part of the television series, Climax!. It was written by Rod Serling. John Frankenheimer was the director and Martin Manulis the producer. Frankenheimer was nominated for an Emmy for his direction.

Plot
Art Shaddick (played by Jack Carson), was an Oscar-winning screenwriter many years ago and is now an unsuccessful, abrasive, and desperate literary agent. His secretary Barbara (played by Kim Hunter) presents him with an excellent script written by her friend, a talented young writer. Shaddick insists that the script needs rewriting and proposes to collaborate on the rewrite. Shaddick's contributions remove the script's freshness.

Cast
The cast consisted of:

 Jack Carson as Art Shaddick
 Kim Hunter as Barbara Williams
 Don Taylor as John Appleby
 Audrey Totter as Edna Shaddick
 Robert F. Simon as Robert Chumley
 John Gallaudet as Boris Lotz

William Lundigan hosted the broadcast.

Production
The movie was broadcast by CBS on November 24, 1955, as part of the television series, Climax!. It was written by Rod Serling. John Frankenheimer was the director and Martin Manulis the producer.

Frankenheimer received his first Emmy nomination for the production.

References

1955 television plays
Films directed by John Frankenheimer
American television episodes